Anwar Shā’ūl (1904–1984) was an Iraqi Jewish journalist, publisher, author, translator, and poet.

Shaul was born in Hillah in 1904 to a second generation Austrian-Iraqi mother and a Mizrahi father. He originally trained as a lawyer at the Baghdad Law College, graduating in 1931. Shaul served as editor of the Arabic-language Iraqi Zionist journal, al-Miṣbāḥ, from 1924 to 1925. In his contributions to the publication, Shaul wrote under the pseudonym Ibn al-Samaw'al (an allusion to the poet, Samaw'al ibn 'Adiya).

From 1929 to 1938, Shaul founded and worked as editor of Al Hassid, a weekly literary magazine. "The Reaper" featured significant political commentary; mixing harsh criticism of European fascism and advocacy for both Iraqi nationalism and complete political independence from the British Empire. Under his editorial leadership, Al Hassid, became the foremost Baghdadi weekly.

In addition to his publication of periodicals, Shaul published a number of longer works including memoirs, translations of western literature into Arabic, as well as anthologies of short stories and Arabic poetry.

In 1971, Shaul, who had long been resistant to emigrating despite intensive State-sponsored anti-Semitism in Baathist Iraq, reluctantly made Aliyah to the State of Israel. Shaul lived in Israel until his death in December 1984.

References 

1904 births
1984 deaths
Jewish Iraqi writers
Jewish poets
Translators to Arabic
Hebrew-language writers
Iraqi writers
20th-century Iraqi writers
20th-century translators
People of Austrian-Jewish descent